Balearic Caper (also known as Operation Gold) is a 1966 Spanish-Italian-French heist-Eurospy comedy film written and directed by José María Forqué and starring Jacques Sernas, Daniela Bianchi and Mireille Darc. It was shot in Ibiza.

Cast  
 
 Jacques Sernas as Pierre 
 Daniela Bianchi  as Mercedes 
 Mireille Darc as  Polly 
 Harold Sakata as Museum Director
 Marilù Tolo as Sofia 
 José Luis López Vázquez as Fernando 
 Venantino Venantini  as Giuliano 
 Adriano Rimoldi

References

External links

Spanish spy comedy films
Italian spy comedy films
French spy comedy films
1960s thriller films
1960s spy comedy films
Films directed by Roberto Bianchi Montero
Films set in Ibiza
Films scored by Benedetto Ghiglia
1966 comedy films
1966 films
1960s Italian films
1960s Spanish films
1960s French films